John Bryan Taylor (born 26 December 1928) is a British physicist known for his contributions to plasma physics and their application in the field of fusion energy. Notable among these is the development of the "Taylor state", describing a minimum-energy configuration that conserves magnetic helicity. Another development was his work on the ballooning transformation, which describes the motion of plasma in toroidal (donut) configurations, which are used in the fusion field. Taylor has also made contributions to the theory of the Earth's Dynamo, including the Taylor constraint.

Early life and career 
Taylor was born in Birmingham. He served in the Royal Air Force from 1950–1952, and then took his PhD at Birmingham University in 1955. Upon graduation, he joined the Atomic Weapons Establishment at Aldermaston, and in 1962 moved to the Culham Laboratory, where he became Chief Physicist. He held several other positions during this period, including the Commonwealth Fund Fellow at the University of California, Berkeley in 1959 to 1960, the Institute for Advanced Study in 1969, 1973 and 1980–81, and finally took the position of Fondren Professor of Plasma Theory at the University of Texas at Austin in 1989. Taylor is still actively involved in fusion science, working with Culham laboratory and Oxford University. He was elected a Fellow of the Royal Society in 1970.

Honors and awards 
Taylor won the Institute of Physics's James Clerk Maxwell Medal and Prize in 1971, and the Max Born Medal and Prize in 1979. He then went on to win the American Physical Society's James Clerk Maxwell Prize for Plasma Physics in 1999.

Taylor initiated the study of chaos in magnetic surfaces, developing several contributions to chaos theory and introducing the "standard map" (or Chirikov–Taylor map). He studied 2D-plasmas, demonstrating the inherent Bohm diffusion which had been noticed in magnetic bottles since the 1950s. He then played a major part in developing the "ballooning transformation" for toroidal plasmas, along with Jack Connor and Jim Hastie, which won him the 2004 Hannes Alfvén Prize.

References

1928 births
Living people
British nuclear physicists
Fellows of the Royal Society
Maxwell Medal and Prize recipients
Alumni of the University of Birmingham
University of California, Berkeley people
University of Texas at Austin faculty
Fellows of the American Physical Society